William Foye (November 1, 1716 – September 1, 1771) was a political figure in Nova Scotia. He was a member of the Nova Scotia House of Assembly from 1758 to 1759.

He was born in Boston, Massachusetts, the son of William Foye, who served as treasurer and receiver-general of Massachusetts, and Elizabeth Campbell. Foye was educated at Harvard College. He served as lieutenant in the expedition against Cartagena. Foye came to Halifax with Edward Cornwallis in 1749. He served as provost marshal for the province from 1749 until his death and was lieutenant-colonel in the Halifax militia. He died in Halifax at the age of 54.

References
A Directory of the Members of the Legislative Assembly of Nova Scotia, 1758-1958, Public Archives of Nova Scotia (1958)
Expedition of Honour, p. 164

Harvard College alumni
Nova Scotia pre-Confederation MLAs
Politicians from Boston
18th-century American people
18th-century Canadian politicians
1716 births
1771 deaths